An auteur ('author') is an artist with a distinctive approach, usually a film director whose filmmaking control is so unbounded but personal that the director is likened to be the "author" of the film, which thus manifests the director's unique style or thematic focus. As an unnamed value, auteurism originated in French film criticism of the late 1940s, and derives from the critical approach of André Bazin and Alexandre Astruc, whereas American critic Andrew Sarris in 1962 called it auteur theory. Yet the concept first appeared in French in 1955 when director François Truffaut termed it policy of the authors, and interpreted the films of some directors, like Alfred Hitchcock, as a body revealing recurring themes and preoccupations.

American actor Jerry Lewis directed his own 1960 film The Bellboy via sweeping control, and was praised for "personal genius." By 1970, the New Hollywood era emerged with studios granting directors broad leeway. Pauline Kael argued, however, that "auteurs" rely on creativity of others, like cinematographers. Georges Sadoul deemed a film's putative "author" potentially even an actor, but a film indeed collaborative. Aljean Harmetz cited major control even by film executives. David Kipen's view of screenwriter as indeed main author is termed Schreiber theory. In the 1980s, large failures prompted studios to reassert most control. The auteur concept has also been applied to non-film directors, such as record producers and video game designers.

Film

Origin 

Even before auteur theory, the director was considered the most important influence on a film. In Germany, an early film theorist, Walter Julius Bloem, explained that since filmmaking is an art geared toward popular culture, a film's immediate influence, the director, is viewed as the artist, whereas an earlier contributor, like the screenwriter, is viewed as an apprentice. James Agee, a leading film critic of the 1940s, said that "the best films are personal ones, made by forceful directors". Meanwhile, the French film critics André Bazin and Roger Leenhardt described that directors, vitalizing films, depict the directors' own worldviews and impressions of the subject matter, as by varying lighting, camerawork, staging, editing, and so on.

Development of theory
As the French New Wave in cinema began, French magazine Cahiers du cinéma, founded in 1951, became a hub of discourse about directors' roles in cinema. In a 1954 essay, François Truffaut criticized the prevailing "Cinema of Quality" whereby directors, faithful to the script, merely adapt a literary novel. Truffaut described such a director as a metteur en scene, a mere "stager" who adds the performers and pictures. To represent the view that directors who express their personality in their work make better films, Truffaut coined the phrase la politique des auteurs, or the policy of the authors, in a 1955 review of Jacques Becker's Ali Baba and the Forty Thieves titled, "Ali Baba et la 'Politique des auteurs'" (February 1955).

Jerry Lewis, an actor from the Hollywood studio system, directed his own 1960 film The Bellboy. Lewis's influence on it spanned business and creative roles, including writing, directing, lighting, editing, and art direction. French film critics, publishing in Cahiers du Cinéma and in Positif, praised Lewis's results. For his mise-en-scene and camerawork, Lewis was likened to Howard Hawks, Alfred Hitchcock, and Satyajit Ray. In particular, Jean-Luc Godard credited Lewis's "personal genius" for making him "the only one in Hollywood doing something different, the only one who isn't falling in with the established categories, the norms, the principles", "the only one today who's making courageous films."

Popularization and influence
As early as his 1962 essay "Notes of the auteur theory", published in the journal Film Culture, American film critic Andrew Sarris translated the French term la politique des auteurs, by François Truffaut in 1955, into Sarris's term auteur theory. Sarris applied it to Hollywood films, and elaborated in his 1968 book, The American Cinema: Directors and Directions 1929–1968, which helped popularized the English term.

Via auteur theory, critical and public scrutiny of films shifted from their stars to the overall creation. In the 1960s and the 1970s, a new generation of directors, revitalizing filmmaking by wielding greater control, manifested the New Hollywood era, when studios granted directors more leeway to take risks. Yet in the 1980s, upon high-profile failures like Heaven's Gate, studios reasserted control, muting the auteur theory.

Criticism 
Pauline Kael, an early critic of auteur theory, debated Andrew Sarris in magazines. Defending a film as a collaboration, her 1971 essay "Raising Kane," examining Orson Welles's 1941 film Citizen Kane, finds extensive reliance on co-writer Herman J. Mankiewicz and on cinematographer Gregg Toland.

Richard Corliss and David Kipen argued that a film's success relies more on screenwriting. In 2006, to depict the screenwriter as the film's principal author, Kipen coined the term Schreiber theory.

To film historian Georges Sadoul, a film's main "author" can also be an actor, screenwriter, producer, or novel's author, although a film is a collective's work. Film historian Aljean Harmetz, citing classical Hollywood's input by producers and executives, held that auteur theory "collapses against the reality of the studio system".

In a feminist criticism, Maria Giese in 2013 alleged that the auteur theory is biased to males, as the pantheons of auteurs barely include a woman. This may reflect the sheer scarcity of women as directors, with about 7% of directors being women among the 250 highest-grossing films in 2016.

Law
In some law references, a film is treated as artwork while the auteur, as its creator, is the original copyright holder. Under European Union law, largely by influence of auteur theory, a film director is considered the film's author or one of its authors.

Popular music 

The references of auteur theory are occasionally applied to musicians, musical performers and music producers. From the 1960s, record producer Phil Spector is considered the first auteur among producers of popular music. Author Matthew Bannister named him the first "star" producer. Journalist Richard Williams wrote:

Another early pop music auteur was Brian Wilson, mentored by Spector. In 1962, Wilson's band, the Beach Boys, signed to Capitol Records, and swiftly became a commercial success, whereby Wilson was an early recording artist who was also an entrepreneurial producer. Before the "progressive pop" of the late 1960s, performers typically had little input on their own records. Wilson, however, employed the studio like an instrument, as well as a high level of studio control that other artists soon sought.

According to The Atlantics Jason Guriel, the Beach Boys' 1966 album Pet Sounds, produced by Wilson, anticipated later auteurs such as Kanye West, as well as "the rise of the producer" and "the modern pop-centric era, which privileges producer over artist and blurs the line between entertainment and art. ... Anytime a band or musician disappears into a studio to contrive an album-length mystery, the ghost of Wilson is hovering near."

See also 

 Authenticity in art
 Film d'auteur
 La mort de l'auteur
 List of film auteurs
 Philosophy of film
 Vulgar auteurism

Citations

General and cited references

Further reading

External links 

 16+ source guides: Auteur Theory/Auteurs at the British Film Institute
 Auteurism Is Alive and Well by Andrew Sarris on Internet Archive
 The American Cinema: Directors and Direction 1929–1968

 
1940s neologisms
Artists
Concepts in aesthetics
Concepts in film theory
Film theory